Garbatka-Dziewiątka  is a village in the administrative district of Gmina Garbatka-Letnisko, within Kozienice County, Masovian Voivodeship, in east-central Poland.

See also
Garbatka, Garbatka Długa, Garbatka-Letnisko, Garbatka-Zbyczyn

References

External links
 
 
 

Villages in Kozienice County